Riccardo De Luca (born 22 March 1986) is an Italian modern pentathlete. De Luca is an athlete of the Centro Sportivo Carabinieri.

Biography
He won a team gold medal at the 2012 World Championships and placed nine and fifth at the 2012 and 2016 Olympics, respectively. De Luca took up pentathlon in 1999. He works as a police officer.

References

1986 births
Living people
Italian male modern pentathletes
Olympic modern pentathletes of Italy
Modern pentathletes at the 2012 Summer Olympics
Modern pentathletes at the 2016 Summer Olympics
Sportspeople from Rome
World Modern Pentathlon Championships medalists
Modern pentathletes of Centro Sportivo Carabinieri
21st-century Italian people